Brisson is a French surname. Notable people with the surname include:

Antoine-François Brisson (1728–1796), French lawyer
Barnabé Brisson (1531–1591), French jurist and politician
Barnabé Brisson (engineer) (1777–1828), French engineer
Brendan Brisson (born 2001), American ice hockey player
Eugène Henri Brisson (1835–1912), Prime Minister of France
François Brisson (born 1958), French footballer
Gerry Brisson (1937–2013), Canadian hockey player and coach
Jean-Paul Brisson (1918–2006), French historian of Roman history
Jean-Serge Brisson (born 1954), Canadian politician
Louis Brisson (1817–1908), French cleric later sainted
Mathurin Jacques Brisson (1723–1806), French zoologist
Thérèse Brisson (born 1966), Canadian ice hockey player

See also 
Brisson, Ontario, a former Canadian locality in the township of Russell in Ontario, Canada;
Brisson River, tributary of the Quebec Grand Touradi river, in the Bas-Saint-Laurent administrative region, in Quebec, Canada;
Brisson River (Rimouski River tributary), tributary of the eastern bank of the Rimouski River of the Bas-Saint-Laurent, in Quebec, Canada.
Brisson River (rivière aux Anglais), a tributary of the rivière aux Anglais in Rivière-aux-Outardes, Quebec, Canada
Brison (disambiguation)

French-language surnames